The Cortlandt/Cooney family is a fictional family on the original ABC daytime soap opera, All My Children.

Family members

First Generation
 Palmer Cortlandt [born Pete Cooney] (died 2010) - Bess's older brother.
 Lottie Chandler (deceased) - Palmer's lover, Ross's mother and sister of Adam and Stuart Chandler.
 Daisy Cortlandt - Palmer's first wife and mother of Nina.
 Opal Cortlandt - Palmer's ex-wife and mother of Petey.
 Cynthia Preston - Palmer's ex-wife and mother of Andrew. 
 Bess Cooney-Hunkle (deceased) - Palmer's younger sister, Dixie, Will, and Melanie's mother, Paul Hunkle's wife. 
 Paul Hunkle 
 Unknown Cooney (deceased) - Palmer and Bess's sibling and Caleb's mother or father.

Second Generation
 Ross Chandler 
 Ellen Shepard
 Nina Cortlandt 
 Cliff Warner 
 Andrew Preston-Cortlandt (adopted by Palmer)
 Pete Cortlandt (born 1992)
 Dixie Cooney Martin (born 1962) 
 Adam Chandler
 Tad Martin
 Will Cortlandt (died 1992)
 Hayley Vaughan
 Melanie "Lanie" Cortlandt-Rampal
 David Rampal 
 Caleb Cortlandt
 Sonia Reyes (deceased)

Third Generation
 Julie Rand Chandler (adopted daughter of Ross and Ellen)
 Nico Kelly
 Robert "Bobby" Warner (born 1981; Nina's adopted son)
 Kate Jefferson
 Anita Santos
 Michael Warner (born 1987)
 Adam "JR" Chandler, Jr. (born 1989 revised to 1983)
 Babe Carey
 Marissa Tasker
 Asher Pike
 Kathleen Martin

Fourth Generation
 Sam Grey (born 1996 revised to 1990) 
 Adam Chandler III (born 2004 revised to 1997) [JR's son with Babe later adopted by Marissa]

Family tree

Cooney
 Palmer Cortlandt (died 2010) [Born Pete Cooney]
 a. Charlotte "Lottie" Chandler (deceased)
 c. Ross Chandler
 m. Daisy Murdoch [divorced]
 c. Nina Cortlandt
 m. Donna Beck [divorced 1981]
 m. Cynthia Preston [married 1985; divorced]
 c. Andrew Preston-Cortlandt (adopted by Palmer)
 m. Natalie Marlowe [divorced]
 m. Daisy Murdoch [divorced]
 m. Opal Purdy [married 1990; divorced 1998]
 c. Pete Cortlandt (born 1992)
 m. Vanessa Bennett [married 2000; divorced]
 Bess Cooney (deceased)
 m. Paul "Seabone" Hunkle
 c. William "Will" Cortlandt (died 1992)
 m. Hayley Vaughan [married 1992]
 c. Dixie Cooney (born 1963)
 m. Adam Chandler Sr. [married 1989; invalid]
 c. Adam "JR" Chandler, Jr. (born 1989 revised 1983)
 m. Babe Carey [2003; invalid]
 c. Adam "AJ" Chandler, III (born 2004 revised 1997)
 m. Babe Carey [married 2004; divorced 2005]
 m. Babe Carey [married 2006; divorced 2007]
 m. Marissa Tasker (Born 1983)[married 2009]
 c. AJ Chandler (adopted by Marissa)
 m. Tad Martin ( Born 1963) [married 1989; divorced 1990]
 m. Craig Lawson [divorced]
 m. Brian Bodine [married 1992; divorced 1993]
 m. Tad Martin [married 1994; divorced 1996]
 m. Tad Martin [married 1999; divorced 2002]
 c. Unnamed daughter (miscarriage)
 c. Katherine "Kathy" Martin (born 2002)
 c. Melanie "Lanie" Cortlandt
 m. David Rampal [married 1992]
 Unknown Cooney (deceased)
 m. Unknown person (deceased)
 c. Caleb Cortlandt
 m. Sonia Reyes (deceased; 1990)
 c. Asher Pike (born 1990)

Notes

All My Children characters
All My Children families